Rashed Al-Dwesan is a Saudi Arabian football player who currently plays as a defender for Al-Selmiyah.

References

External links
leaguespy.com Profile
slstat.com Profile

1990 births
Living people
Saudi Arabian footballers
Al-Shoulla FC players
Al-Riyadh SC players
Al-Arabi SC (Saudi Arabia) players
Al-Sharq Club players
Al-Selmiyah Club players
Saudi Second Division players
Saudi First Division League players
Saudi Professional League players
Saudi Third Division players
Association football defenders